Rituals is an album of contemporary classical music by American avant-garde composer John Zorn. The piece takes the form of an opera in five parts and was premiered at the Bayreuth Opera Festival in 1988.

Reception

The Allmusic review by Dan Warburton awarded the album 3½ stars stating "It's a well-crafted work, superbly performed".

Writing for Pitchfork Media, Matthew Murphy stated "for established Zorn enthusiasts, Rituals is replete with moments to confound, enrich and delight, and will surely lure you to its darkened altar for frequent repeat ceremonies".

Track listing
All compositions by John Zorn.
 "I" - 4:48
 "II" - 7:45
 "III" - 4:21
 "IV" - 5:21
 "V" - 4:19

Personnel
Jennifer Choi – violin
Fred Sherry – cello
Tara O'Connor – flute, alto flute, piccolo
Michael Lowenstern – clarinet, bass clarinet, E-flat clarinet
Peter Kolkay – bassoon, contrabassoon
Jim Pugh – trombone
Stephen Drury – piano, harpsichord, celeste, organ
Kurt Muroki – bass
Jim Pugliese – percussion, wind machines, water, bullroarers, gravedigging, fishing reels, paper, bowls of BBs, bird calls
William Winant – percussion
Heather Gardner – voice
Brad Lubman – conductor

Production
 Produced by: John Zorn
 Mastered by: George Marino at Sterling Sound, NYC

References

2005 albums
Albums produced by John Zorn
John Zorn albums
Tzadik Records albums